At the 1999 Military World Games, the track and field events were held at the Sportski Park Mladost athletic stadium in Zagreb, Croatia from 11–16 August. A total of 32 events were contested, of which 22 by male and 10 by female athletes. The marathon events were held on 11 August, prior to the track and field competition. It was the last time that the men's 20 kilometres walk and women's shot put featured on the programme. The women's 1500 metres and 5000 metres were added to the programme for the first time (the latter replacing the 3000 metres distance). Nations could enter a maximum of two athletes into each event.

Only three athletes successfully defended their titles from the inaugural edition: Shem Kororia won the men's 5000 m to retain his gold medal, Boris Henry defended his title in the men's javelin throw, while Yekaterina Leshchova repeated as women's 100 metres champion and also added the 200 metres title to her honours. A total of 22 Games records were set during the competition, including new records in all but two of the women's events and all the men's field events. Seven world bests for military competition were set during the competition.

Italy topped the medal table in the athletics competition, having taken four golds and fourteen medals in total. Kenya was the next most successful nation with four medals of each colour. Germany also won four gold medals, while Russia had the third highest medal total with eleven. Host nation Croatia won five athletics medals, though none of them gold.

Several athletes went on to success at the 1999 World Championships in Athletics held one week later, including Djabir Saïd-Guerni (800 m bronze), Fabrizio Mori (400 m hurdles gold) and Nadine Kleinert (shot put silver). The games-winning Polish men's 4×400 metres relay team also became world champions that year.

Medal summary

Men

Women

Medal table

References

Results
Military World Games. GBR Athletics. Retrieved on 2014-11-17.
2nd Military World Games - 1999 Results (archived). CISM. Retrieved on 2014-11-21.

1999
Military World Games
Track and field
International athletics competitions hosted by Croatia